Eldbjørg Raknes (born 9 February 1970 in Midsund, Norway) is a Norwegian jazz vocalist known for her a cappella vocal performances, innovative improvised vocals and electronic effects. She has collaborated with musicians such as Jon Balke, Anders Jormin, Bendik Hofseth, Christian Wallumrød, Arve Henriksen, Ketil Bjørnstad, and Ståle Storløkken. She is the sister of the bassist Steinar Raknes.

Career 
Raknes was educated in the music program of Atlanten videregående skole (secondary school) in Kristiansund (1986–89), in drama at Romerike Folkehøgskole (Folk high school - 1990), and in the Jazz program at Trondheim Conservatory of Music (1991–94), with specializations in voice pedagogy, arrangement, and composition. As a student she sang with Bodega Band and collaborated with the keyboardist Christian Wallumrød among others. She has also worked with the vocal quartet Kvitretten, with three album releases. She currently works as an instructor in the jazz program at Trondheim Conservatory of Music.

She has toured with Concerts Norway and played at several international jazz festivals in a duo with Anders Jormin as well as a member of groups including Bodega Band, TINGeLING, Søyr, Kvitretten, and Trondheim Voices.

Raknes has her own recording company, "My Recordings" (2006).

Honors 
2000:Kardemommestipendiet
2011:Radka Toneff Memorial Award
2011: Buddyprisen
2012: Gammleng-prisen inn the class Jazz

Discography 
Solo projects
1996: Voices (Curling Legs)
1999: Det bor en Gammel Baker... (Via Music), original compositions to lyrics by Inger Hagerup
2002: So Much Depends on a Red Wheel Barrow, (Platearbeiderne), commissioned work for Vossajazz
2004: Många Röster Talar (Bergland Prod.), with Maria Kannegaard (piano), Mats Eilertsen (bass), and Per Oddvar Johansen (trommer), original compositions to lyrics by Karin Boye
2005: Små sanger mest i det blå (Bergland Prod.), original compositions to lyrics by Torgeir Rebolledo Pedersen and others
2006: Solo (My Recordings), solo improvisations on lyrics by Olav H. Hauge, Lewis Allen, Federico García Lorca, and Doris Q
2009: From frozen feet heat came (My Recordings), with Eirik Hegdal (saxophone) and Stian Westerhus (guitar)
2013: Open (My Recordings), with Audun Kleive
2014: You Make Me Feel (My Recordings), with Oscar Grönberg

With others
1992: En flik av ((Studentersamfundet i Trondhjem, Plateselskapet)), with Bodega Band
1996: Sjå alltid etter ein utveg, with ESE (Elin Rosseland & Sidsel Endresen)
1996: Letters (Turn Left Prod.), with Håvard Lund
1997: Reisetid (Grappa Music), with Ketil Bjørnstad
1997: Vinterreise (Tylden)
1997: Med kjøtt og kjærlighet" (Curling Legs), with Søyr
1997: TINGeLING'' (NorCD), with Nils-Olav Johansen (guitar), Per Oddvar Johansen (drums) & Maria Kannegaard (keyboard)

References

External links 

Eldbjørg Raknes at Trondheim Conservatory of Music (Norwegian University of Science and Technology)
MySpace page
Eldbjørg Raknes at Oriolecollection.com

20th-century Norwegian pianists
21st-century Norwegian pianists
Norwegian women jazz singers
Norwegian jazz pianists
Musicians from Midsund
Norwegian jazz composers
Grappa Music artists
Norwegian University of Science and Technology alumni
1970 births
Living people
20th-century Norwegian women singers
20th-century Norwegian singers
21st-century Norwegian women singers
21st-century Norwegian singers
Søyr members
Trondheim Voices members
TINGeLING members
20th-century women pianists
21st-century women pianists